The Salle des Concerts Herz, usually referred to simply as the Salle Herz, was a former concert hall in Paris, located at 48, rue de la Victoire. It was built in 1838 by the French pianist-composer Henri Herz.

The hall was used for public performances. Hector Berlioz conducted the premières of two of his compositions there – the overture Le Carnaval romain on 3 February 1844 and L'enfance du Christ on 10 December 1854. Offenbach's 'tableau villageois' Le trésor à Mathurin was performed there 'in concert' on 7 May 1853, and Offenbach himself performed there as a cellist.

The first public performance of the saxophone took place there on 3 February 1844.

Non-musical events were also held in the hall. An anti-slavery conference was held there on 27 August 1867 by the British and Foreign Anti-Slavery Society.

The Salle Herz was still being used to mount concerts by Jules Danbé in 1874 but was subsequently demolished.

References 
 Laure Schnapper, Henri Herz, magnat du piano, Paris, EHESS, 2011.

External links 
 Hector Berlioz Website Salle Herz pages, accessed 23 February 2011

Music halls in Paris
Former theatres in Paris
Former music venues in France
Buildings and structures in the 9th arrondissement of Paris
Demolished buildings and structures in Paris
Music venues completed in 1838
1838 establishments in France
Buildings and structures demolished in 1885